Brent Robey (born 26 December 1958) is a South African former cricketer. He played in 26 first-class and 11 List A matches for Eastern Province between 1979/80 and 1993/94.

See also
 List of Eastern Province representative cricketers

References

External links
 

1958 births
Living people
South African cricketers
Eastern Province cricketers
People from Makhanda, Eastern Cape
Cricketers from the Eastern Cape